PBSC may refer to:

Acronym 
 PBSC Urban Solutions, a bike share corporation
 Palm Beach State College
 Peripheral blood stem cells
 Politburo Standing Committee
 Polar Bear Software Corporation
Prayer Book Society of Canada, an Anglican interest group